SS Czar was an ocean liner for the then Russian American Line before World War I. In 1920-1930, the ship was named Estonia for the Baltic American Line, then named Pułaski for the PTTO (later Gdynia America Line) and as a UK Ministry of War Transport troopship, and as Empire Penryn after World War II. The liner was built in Glasgow for the Russian American Line in 1912 and sailed on North Atlantic routes from Liepāja (Libau) to New York. On one eastbound voyage in October 1913, Czar was one of ten ships that came to the aid of the burning Uranium Line steamer .

After the Russian Revolution in 1917, the ship came under the control of the UK Shipping Controller and was managed by the Wilson Line and later, the Cunard Line. Under Cunard management in 1918 as HMT Czar, she was employed as a troopship carrying United States troops to France as part of the United States Navy's Cruiser and Transport Force. After the end of World War I, the ship was returned to the East Asiatic Company, the parent company of the Russian American Line, who placed her on their Baltic American Line sailing in roundtrip passenger service to New York under the name Estonia.

In 1930 the East Asiatic Company sold Baltic American Line to Polish owners who renamed the company Polskiego Transatlantyckiego Towarzystwa Okrętowego ("Polish Transatlantic Shipping Company Limited" or PTTO). In 1931 PTTO renamed the ship Pułaski for passenger service to North and South America. In 1934 PTTO became Gdynia – America Line.

After the outbreak of World War II Pułaski served as an Allied troopship, at first under French control and, after the Fall of France, under UK control. Pułaski sailed variously in the North Atlantic, between African ports, and in the Indian Ocean. In 1946 the ship's name was changed to Empire Penryn and she continued trooping duties under the management of Lamport and Holt. She was scrapped in 1949 at Blyth.

Launching and early career
Barclay Curle & Company of Glasgow, Scotland, built Czar for the Russian American Line, a subsidiary of the Danish East Asiatic Company. Her yard number was 494. She was launched on 23 March 1912 and completed that May.

She had two funnels and two masts.

Czar had accommodation for 30 passengers in first class, 260 in second class, and 1,086 in third class and steerage.

Czar sailed on her maiden voyage on 30 May 1912 from Libau (present-day Liepāja, Latvia) to Copenhagen and New York, arriving in the latter city on 13 June. She replaced  on the Libau – New York route, and sailed with various combinations of Kursk, and  until July 1914.

On her 5 August 1913 sailing from Libau, Czar carried a young Mark Rothko and his family on their way to join his father in the United States; Rothko went on to become a well-known American abstract expressionist painter and printmaker. On her October 1913 eastbound crossing, Czar responded to the distress calls of the Uranium Line steamship  on fire in the middle of the Atlantic The liner joined nine other ships that came to the aid of the stricken ship. In March 1914, King George V of the UK, on recommendation of the Board of Trade, awarded 19 of Czars crew the Silver Sea Gallantry Medal, along with a £3 award each.

World War I
After the outbreak of World War I in August 1914, Czar switched to service from Archangel to New York, but ran only sporadically through 1916. After the Russian Revolution, the East Asiatic Company suspended service on the Russian American Line, and transferred several ships, including Czar, to UK registry. The UK Shipping Controller initially placed the liner under the management of John Ellerman's Wilson Line, but Czar was transferred to the Cunard Line management by the end of 1917.

Now called  Czar, the ship, along with former Russian American Line ships , Kursk, and Dwinsk, was attached to the Cruiser and Transport Force of the United States Navy, and made three trips carrying American troops to France. The convoy was joined by transport  and was escorted by American cruiser . The convoy arrived safely in France on 28 April. Sources do not report when Czar returned to the United States, but she had done so by early June.

On the morning of 16 June, lookouts on Princess Matoika spotted a submarine and, soon after, a torpedo missed that ship by a few yards. The convoy had a false alarm when a floating barrel was mistaken for a submarine, but otherwise uneventfully arrived at Brest on the afternoon of 27 June.

When she departed Newport News on 7 October, Czar began her last voyage ferrying American troops to France. The ships arrived safely in France on 20 October.

Throughout 1919 and into 1920, HMT Czar continued carrying Commonwealth troops under Cunard management. The troopship primarily sailed between UK ports and Mediterranean ports such as Trieste, Malta, Alexandria, and Constantinople. One typical voyage from Alexandria returned 1,600 officers and men—who had been serving in Palestine, Syria, and Egypt—to Plymouth in January 1920. Czar also played a role in the North Russia Campaign of the Allied intervention in the Russian Civil War when the liner departed Hull for North Russia on 28 August 1919.
HMT Czar arrived in the Tyne, from Murmansk last Friday (15 August 1919), with about 1,800 UK and Italian troops from the Syren Force North Russia. Amongst them were about 100 officers, N.C.O's and men of the 6th and 13th Battalions Yorkshire Regiment.

Interwar civilian service
By late 1920 Czar had been returned to the East Asiatic Company, who placed her in service for its Baltic American Line subsidiary and renamed her Estonia. For her first Baltic American trip she sailed from Glasgow on 11 January 1921 for New York, Danzig, and Libau, arriving at the latter by mid-February.

In February 1925, Estonia was reconditioned and outfitted with accommodations for 290 cabin-class and 500 third-class passengers. The following March, her accommodations were altered for 110 cabin-class, 180 tourist-class, and 500 third-class passengers. Her last voyage for the Baltic American Line began on 31 January 1930 when she sailed from Danzig to Copenhagen, Halifax, and New York. Sold to the Polish-owned PTTO (later Gdynia America Line), she sailed on 13 March for one more trip on the Danzig – New York route under the name Estonia.

Before her next voyage on 25 April 1930, she was renamed Pułaski, after Polish soldier and American Revolutionary War general Kazimierz Pułaski. As Pułaski her code letters were PBRF. When maritime call signs were given to merchant ships in 1934 she was given the call sign SPEC. Around the same time she was fitted with a gyrocompass.

SS Pułaski continued sailing the same route through August 1935, when she was moved to Gdynia – Buenos Aires service. She began her last voyage on this route on 21 April 1939.

World War II

With the signing of the Anglo-Polish military alliance impending, Pułaski sailed from Gdynia to Falmouth on 24 August 1939. On 26 September, the ship left Dartmouth for Gibraltar (calling there on 2 September) and Piraeus, where she arrived on 13 October. Picking up Polish soldiers there, she sailed five days later for Marseille, where she eventually arrived on 2 December. Until March 1940, Pułaski underwent a refit in Marseille after which she sailed under charter to the French Fabre Line. At the end of the 1930s, the Fabre Line sailed ships on a Marseille–Dakar route with intermediate stops in other African ports.

On 10 March, Pułaski departed Marseille on the first of three voyages from that port. She sailed to Algiers and from there to Dakar on 13 March. Pułaski left Dakar for Freetown, Sierra Leone, and Conakry, French Guinea, returning to Dakar in early April. Sailing for Marseille on 5 April, the ship returned on 13 April as a part of convoy DF 29. Leaving again about two weeks later, she repeated the trip and returned to Marseille on 29 May as a part of convoy DF 41. By the time of her return, the German invasion of France had been underway for nearly three weeks.

Pułaski sailed on her third and final French voyage on 6 June. The liner arrived at Dakar on 15 June, and sailed the next day for Freetown, where she arrived on 18 June. Likely because of the confusion surrounding the French surrender on 22 June, Pułaskis movements over the next days are unrecorded, but she was detained at Conakry on 8 July by Vichy authorities. That evening, Pułaskis crew raised steam and sailed the ship out of the harbor in defiance of the detainment. After taking fire from shore batteries at Conakry, the ship arrived back at Freetown on 9 July.

UK troopship
All three ships retained their Polish crews but also carried a Lamport and Holt liaison officer aboard. Four days later, Pułaski joined convoy SL 44, the 44th wartime convoy from Sierra Leone to Liverpool, with nearly 30 other ships and 10 escorts. Pułaski and about half of the ships departed the convoy at Liverpool on 7 September, while the other half continued on for Methil.

Pułaski next made her way to the Clyde in late October. Between 10 May and 12 June 1941, she sailed on three roundtrip trooping runs between Clyde and Iceland. In late June, Pułaski, loaded with 2,047 troops, sailed from Clyde to join convoy WS 9B headed for Freetown. The convoy arrived at its destination on 13 July. After three days, Pułaski and four other ships sailed on to Cape Town, arriving on 27 July. Leaving behind one ship at Cape Town, Pułaski and the others sailed on 30 July to their final destination of Aden, where they arrived in mid August.

Over the next seven months, Pułaski operated in the Indian Ocean, primarily sailing between Middle Eastern and East African ports. Beginning in late August, Pułaski sailed between Aden and ports of Suez, Durban, Berbera, Mombasa, Massawa, Port Sudan, and Kilindini. From Kilindini, in March 1942, the liner sailed to Colombo and back to Durban on 8 April. While at Durban, a fire gutted the bridge in what may have been sabotage.

The damaged Pułaski made her way to East London in South Africa on 11 April where she remained under repair until June. Departing East London on 25 June, she resumed her Middle Eastern and African runs between Aden, Suez, and Durban. In November, the transport departed Aden and called at Basra, Bandar Abbas, and Karachi, before returning to Durban in early December. After nearly a two-month stay at Durban, Pułaski returned to her trooping duties in the Indian Ocean on 1 February 1943. She made her first visits to Diego Suarez, Zanzibar, and Tamatave in March, and Djibouti in April.

After a return to East London from Durban on 30 May, the ship put in for another extended stay, this time for four months. Resuming her trooping runs on 29 September, Pułaski began a year of almost continuous sailing. During this span, which lasted until mid-September 1944, the ship called at Bombay twice in addition to numerous stops in Aden, Suez, Durban, and Kilindini. Putting in at Durban on 15 September, Pułaski had a general refit over the next four months.

Pułaski resumed her Indian Ocean service when she left Durban on 21 January 1945, headed for Kilindini. She visited Dar es Salaam for the first time in April, and departed from her first visit to Madras on Victory in Europe Day, 8 May 1945. Headed to Akyab, Burma, she started the first of five India–Burma roundtrips through July. Over the next months, she shuttled between Rangoon, Calcutta (where she was docked on Victory over Japan Day), Chittagong, Madras, and Colombo, arriving at the latter port for the final time on 12 September. From Colombo she sailed into the Western Pacific for Singapore where she arrived for the first of several visits on 14 September, two days after the Japanese garrison there surrendered. Through the end of 1945, Pułaski continued sailing between Singapore and India, making additional stops at Port Swettenham, Chittagong, Sourabaya, and Batavia.

Pułaski arrived at Calcutta on 23 December 1945. Thereafter she continued to carry troops in the Indian Ocean, though her specific movements are not known. In March 1946, Pułaski was purchased by the Ministry of War Transport for £100,000. It was around this time the Polish crews of Pułaski and Kościuszko refused to be repatriated to Soviet-occupied Poland. The crew members all signed UK articles.

On 16 April 1946 Pułaski was formally handed over to UK authorities, who renamed the vessel Empire Penryn. Empire followed the naming convention for UK merchant ships under MoWT ownership. Penryn was after the port of Penryn, Cornwall. Remaining under Lamport and Holt management, Empire Penryn carried troops in the Mediterranean. She was taken out of service in 1948, and on 19 February 1950 she reached Blyth, Northumberland to be scrapped.

Notes

References

Bibliography

External links

1912 ships
Ships built on the River Clyde
Ocean liners
Allied intervention in the Russian Civil War
Steamships of Russia
Passenger ships of Russia
World War I passenger ships of Russia
Steamships of Denmark
Passenger ships of Denmark
Steamships of the United Kingdom
Troop ships of the United Kingdom
World War I merchant ships of the United Kingdom
Pułaski
Pułaski
Pułaski
Empire ships
Merchant ships of the United Kingdom
Ships of the Lamport and Holt Line
Pułaski